Herrero is a Spanish-language occupational surname literally meaning "blacksmith". The feminine form is Herrera. People with this surname include:

Abel Herrero (born 1971), Cuban artist
Abel Herrero (born 1969), Texas politician
Álvaro Peña Herrero (born 1991), Spanish footballer
André Herrero (born 1938), French rugby union player
Antonia Herrero (1897–1978), Argentine actress
Bruno Herrero Arias (born 1985), Spanish footballer
Carlos Ruiz Herrero (born 1948), Spanish footballer
David Herrero (born 1979), Spanish cyclist
Gerardo Herrero (born 1953), Spanish filmmaker
Gonzalo Herrero (born 1989), Spanish footballer
Jesús María Herrero (born 1984), Spanish footballer
José María Maravall Herrero (born 1942), Spanish academic and politician
José Ramón Herrero Merediz (1931–2016), Spanish politician
Liliana Herrero (born 1948), Argentine musician
Luis Herrero-Tejedor Algar (born 1955), Spanish politician
Manolo Herrero (born 1970), Spanish footballer and coach
Manuel Herrero Maestre (born 1967), Spanish footballer and coach
Miguel Alfonso Herrero (born 1988), Spanish footballer
Nieves Herrero (born 1957), Spanish journalist, presenter, and writer
Oscar Herrero (born 1959), Spanish Flamenco guitarist
Rodolfo Herrero (fl. 1910–1920), Mexican military officer
Santiago Herrero (1943–1970), Spanish motorcycle racer
Santiago Herrero Amor (born 1971), Spanish futsal player
Sheila Herrero Lapuente (born 1976), Spanish inline speed skater
Stephen Herrero, Canadian doctor of animal behaviour and ecology
Subas Herrero (1943–2013), Spanish Filipino actor and singer
Manuel Herrero Fernández  (born 1947), Bishop of Palencia, Spain